Rasbora sumatrana is a species of ray-finned fish in the genus Rasbora which is found in south-east Asia in the Chao Praya and the Mekong as well as on Sumatra and in western Borneo.

References 

Rasboras
Fish described in 1852
Taxa named by Pieter Bleeker